"Ourselves Alone" is the second episode of the second season of the HBO television series Boardwalk Empire, which originally aired October 2, 2011. The episode was written by Howard Korder and directed by executive producer David Petrarca.

Plot
Nucky is released from jail, and becomes aware of the defection of several key allies, including his brother Eli and Jimmy, to the Commodore. Margaret, in disguise, takes an active role in helping Nucky's business, retrieving incriminating pieces of evidence from his office while it is being searched by government agents. Jimmy visits New York to discuss a business proposal with Rothstein that would essentially replace Nucky with Jimmy as supplier. Afterwards, Jimmy plays cards with Luciano and Lansky, who suggest they go into heroin distribution. After the game, Jimmy kills a pair of well-connected Mafia hoods who try to rob him. Chalky, still in jail, is taunted and attacked by another inmate from out of town. His influence is demonstrated when all of his cellmates come to his defense.

Reception
The episode received generally positive reviews from critics. The A.V. Club awarded the episode a B+ saying, "It’s moments like these—Jimmy in Rothstein’s office, Jimmy at the poker game, Chalky in a cell with Purnsley—that make Boardwalk Empire a much better show than its detractors allow." IGN gave it an 8 out of 10, noting the improved pacing, "'Ourselves Alone' seems to be a direct response to those who had issues with the overall pacing of last season, complaining that the gears on Nucky's political machine turned too slow. It's only the second episode of the new season, and Nucky's already plotting retaliation against those challenging him."

References

External links 
 "Ourselves Alone" at HBO
 

2011 American television episodes
Boardwalk Empire episodes